The Middle East Studies Association of North America (MESA) offers four book awards at its fall annual conference.

Albert Hourani Book Award
The Albert Hourani Book Award is an award honoring scholarly non-fiction books, given by the Middle East Studies Association of North America (MESA) to "recognize outstanding publishing in Middle East studies" and to honor work "that exemplifies scholarly excellence and clarity of presentation in the tradition of Albert Hourani", the distinguished scholar of Arab and Islamic history.  On occasion two authors have shared the year's award; in some years, the society has given honorable mention distinctions.  MESA first gave the award in 1991.

Award winners

Roger Owen Book Award
The Roger Owen Book Award, first given in 2011, recognizes the very best in economics, economic history, or the political economy of the Middle East and North Africa scholarship. The award honors Roger Owen for his long and distinguished career and scholarly contributions. The biennial award is given in odd-numbered years

Award winners

Fatema Mernissi Book Award
The Fatema Mernissi Book Award was established in 2017 to recognize outstanding scholarship in studies of gender, sexuality, and women’s lived experience. The annual award was named for Fatema Mernissi to recognize her long and distinguished career as a scholar and as a public intellectual.

Award winners

Nikki Keddie Book Award
The Nikki Keddie Book Award was established in 2017 to recognize outstanding scholarly work in the area of religion, revolution, and/or society. The annual award was named for Nikki Keddie to recognize her long and distinguished career as a scholar and teacher.

Award winners

References

Sources 
Homepage of the awards

Non-fiction literary awards